The year 2018 was the 25th year in the history of the K-1, an international kickboxing event. The year started with K-1: K’Festa 1.

List of events

K-1 World GP 2018: K'FESTA.1

K-1 World GP 2018: K'FESTA.1 was a kickboxing event held by K-1 on March 21, 2018 at the Saitama Super Arena in Saitama, Japan.

Background
This event features six world title fights and an 8-Man Super Featherweight Tournament.

Wei Rui, came overweight at the weigh-ins and his title was vacated. By winning Koya Urabe was eligible for the title while Wei Rui was ineligible and in case of him winning the title would have become vacant.

Fight Card

K-1 World GP 2018 -60kg Japan Tournament bracket

K-1 World GP 2018: 2nd Featherweight Championship Tournament

K-1 World GP 2018: 2nd Featherweight Championship Tournament will be a kickboxing event held by K-1 on June 17, 2018 at the Saitama Super Arena in Saitama, Japan.

Background
This event will feature an 8-Man Featherweight Tournament.

Fight Card

K-1 World GP 2018 2nd Featherweight Championship Tournament bracket

K-1 World GP 2018: inaugural Cruiserweight Championship Tournament

K-1 World GP 2018: inaugural Cruiserweight Championship Tournament will be a kickboxing event held by K-1 on September 24, 2018 at the Saitama Super Arena in Saitama, Japan.

Background
This event will feature an 8-Man Cruiserweight Tournament.

Results

K-1 World GP 2018 Cruiserweight Tournament bracket

K-1 World GP 2018: 3rd Super Lightweight Championship Tournament

K-1 World GP 2018: 3rd Super Lightweight Championship Tournament will be a kickboxing event held by K-1 on November 3, 2018 at the Saitama Super Arena in Saitama, Japan.

Background
This event will feature an 8-Man Super Lightweight Tournament.

Fight Card

K-1 World GP 2018 Super Lightweight Tournament bracket

K-1 World GP 2018: K-1 Lightweight World's Strongest Tournament

K-1 World GP 2018: K-1 Lightweight World's Strongest Tournament was a kickboxing event held by K-1 on December 8, 2018 at the Edion Arena Osaka in Osaka, Japan.

Background
This event will feature an 8-Man Lightweight Tournament.

Results

K-1 World GP 2018 Lightweight Tournament bracket

See also
2018 in Glory 
2018 in Glory of Heroes
2018 in Kunlun Fight  
2018 in ONE Championship
2018 in Romanian kickboxing

References

K-1 events
2018 in kickboxing
2018 in Japanese sport